Jônatas Grassia Faro (born August 11, 1987) is a Brazilian actor and singer.

Personal life 
In April 2010 Jonatas started dating Danielle Winits after her marriage ended. On December 8 they were married in a civil union. At the same time, it was announced that the couple expected a son, Guy Faro, born on April 28, 2011. A month earlier, however, the couple had separated.

Filmography

Stage

Discography

Extended plays (EPs)

Singles

Awards and nominations

References

External links 

 
 
 

1987 births
Living people
People from Niterói
Brazilian male television actors
Brazilian male film actors
Brazilian male stage actors
21st-century Brazilian male singers
21st-century Brazilian singers